Baragash (Baragaş) is a rural locality (a selo) in Shebalinsky District, the Altai Republic, Russia. The population was 760 as of 2016. There are 11 streets.

Geography 
Baragash is located 94 km west of Shebalino (the district's administrative centre) by road. Shyrgaytu is the nearest rural locality.

References 

Rural localities in Shebalinsky District